Section 125 of the Constitution Act, 1867 is a provision of the Constitution of Canada relating to taxation immunities of the federal and provincial governments.  The section provides that the property of the provincial and federal governments are not subject to taxation.

The Constitution Act, 1867  is the constitutional statute which established Canada.  Originally named the British North America Act, 1867, the Act continues to be the foundational statute for the Constitution of Canada, although it has been amended many times since 1867.  It is now recognised as part of the supreme law of Canada.

Constitution Act, 1867

The Constitution Act, 1867 is part of the Constitution of Canada and thus part of the supreme law of Canada.  It was the product of extensive negotiations by the governments of the British North American provinces in the 1860s. The Act sets out the constitutional framework of Canada, including the structure of the federal government and the powers of the federal government and the provinces.  Originally enacted in 1867 by the British Parliament under the name the British North America Act, 1867, in 1982 the Act was brought under full Canadian control through the Patriation of the Constitution, and was renamed the Constitution Act, 1867.  Since Patriation, the Act can only be amended in Canada, under the amending formula set out in the Constitution Act, 1982.

Text of section 125 

Section 125 reads:

Section 125 is found in Part VIII of the Constitution Act, 1867, dealing with revenues, debts, assets, and raxation.  It has not been amended since the Act was enacted in 1867.

Nature of the taxation power in Canada

Section 125 affects the taxation powers of both levels of government, and has received a broad interpretation in the Canadian courts.

Since the 1930 Supreme Court of Canada ruling in Lawson v. Interior Tree Fruit and Vegetables Committee of Direction, taxation is held to consist of the following characteristics:

 it is enforceable by law;
 imposed under the authority of the legislature;
 levied by a public body; and
 intended for a public purpose.

In addition, the 1999 SCC ruling in Westbank First Nation v. British Columbia Hydro and Power Authority has also declared  that a government levy would be in pith and substance a tax if it was "unconnected to any form of a regulatory scheme." The test for a regulatory fee set out in Westbank requires:

 a complete, complex and detailed code of regulation; 
 a regulatory purpose which seeks to affect some behaviour;
 the presence of actual or properly estimated costs of the regulation; and
 a relationship between the person being regulated and the regulation, where the person being regulated either benefits from, or causes the need for, the regulation.

This is important to note, as taxation is barred under s. 121, but regulatory fees are not, and Canadian jurisprudence under s. 125 has turned on that distinction.

Interpretation in the Canadian courts

The nature of s. 125 has been described as thus:

Therefore, its prohibition covers taxation on the holding, as well as the acquisition and disposal, of property. In addition:

 the provision also extends to property held by Crown corporations, and
 the prohibition on levying such taxation also extends to local governments levying taxes on federal property, as well as to First nations levying taxes on provincial property, although measures have been taken to mitigate the impact.

However, provinces must collect and remit sales taxes on any commercial sales they make, since the obligation when it acts as supplier does not amount to a taxation of the province's property.

In addition, provincial authorities must still pay customs duties, because such charges are not strictly based on the taxation power. As noted in the Johnnie Walker case:

Because of that, as noted in Re Exported Natural Gas Tax:

Notes

References

 

Constitution of Canada
Canadian Confederation
Federalism in Canada